Carl Engelman (October 21, 1929 – November 26, 1983) was an American computer scientist. Carl is best known as the creator of MATHLAB. He was employed by Mitre Corporation and Symbolics.

He was a visiting professor at the University of Turin through a grant provided by National Research Council (Italy).

References 

1929 births
1983 deaths
20th-century American mathematicians
American computer scientists
Burials at Mount Auburn Cemetery